Dordoni is a surname. Notable people with the surname include:

 Giovanni Battista Dordoni (died 1599), Italian painter
 Pino Dordoni (1926–1998), Italian Olympic athlete

Other uses
 Dordoni Alessandro Del Socaccio, manga/anime character